"The Meaning of Peace" (stylized as the meaning of peace) is a single by Japanese R&B singer-songwriter Koda Kumi and South Korean pop singer-songwriter BoA. The single debuted on Oricon and No. 12 and remained on the charts for twelve weeks.

Information
the meaning of peace is a collaborative effort between Japanese artist Kumi Koda and Korean artist BoA. The single peaked at No. 12 on the Oricon charts and charted for twelve weeks.

The single was done for the Song Nation project, which was created to help raise funds for the September 11 attacks in the United States on September 11, 2001, and to honor the victims. All earnings from the singles and the corresponding album, Various Artists Featuring song+nation, were donated to the September 11 Relief Fund.

Other artists under the Avex label also collaborated for the project, with all songs produced by Tetsuya Komuro. Those included were:

a song is born by Ayumi Hamasaki and Keiko
Lovin' It by VERBAL of m-flo and Namie Amuro
in case of me by Kaori Mochida
again by Tomiko Van
My Planet by hitomi

A remix for the meaning of peace was later placed on the album song+nation2 trance.

Both Kumi and BoA would release their own solo versions of the song on separate singles and/or album. BoA released her solo version on her Listen to My Heart album in 2002. Kumi released her solo version on her single love across the ocean (2002) and as a bonus track on her first greatest hits album Best ~first things~ (2005).

Track listing

Chart history
 Debut position: 12
 Peak position: 12
 Weeks in top 200: 6

Sales
 First week estimate: 23,230
 Total estimate: 66,840

Alternate versions
Both Koda Kumi and BoA had their own renditions of the track released by themselves:

BoA
the meaning of peace [Original Version]: Found on the single (2001)
the meaning of peace [TV Mix]: Found on the single (2001)
the meaning of peace [Tatsumaki Remix]: Found on song+nation2 trance (2002)
the meaning of peace [Album Version]: Found on LISTEN TO MY HEART (2002)

Koda Kumi
the meaning of peace [Original Version]: Found on the single (2001)
the meaning of peace [TV Mix]: Found on the single (2001)
the meaning of peace [Tatsumaki Remix]: Found on song+nation2 trance (2002)
the meaning of peace: Found on single Love Across the Ocean (2002)
the meaning of peace [Instrumental]: Found on single Love Across the Ocean (2002)

References

External links
 Kumi Koda official Avex Network website
 BoA official Avex Network website
 Oricon Style

Koda Kumi songs
BoA songs
2001 singles
Female vocal duets
Songs written by Tetsuya Komuro
2001 songs
Avex Trax singles